Stoicani is a commune in Soroca District, Moldova. It is composed of two villages, Soloneț and Stoicani.

References

Communes of Soroca District